Abdel Kader Gangani (born 1941) is a Moroccan boxer. He competed in the men's lightweight event at the 1960 Summer Olympics. At the 1960 Summer Olympics, he lost to Yasuyuki Ito of Japan.

References

External links
 

1941 births
Living people
Moroccan male boxers
Olympic boxers of Morocco
Boxers at the 1960 Summer Olympics
Sportspeople from Casablanca
Lightweight boxers
20th-century Moroccan people